The 2006 Pacific Life Open men's doubles was an event of the 2006 Pacific Life Open men's tennis tournament played in Indian Wells, USA from March 6 through March 19, 2006.

Mark Knowles and Daniel Nestor were the defending champions, and won again, defeating Bob Bryan and Mike Bryan in the final 6–4, 6–4.

Seeds

Draw

Finals

Top half

Bottom half

References

External links
 Main Draw (ATP)
 ITF tournament profile

Men's Doubles